Pablo Held (born 27 December 1986) is a German jazz pianist and composer.

Life and career
Held was born on 27 December 1986. He is from Hagen. His father played the piano and introduced him to the music of Federico Mompou. Held was also influenced and taught by pianist John Taylor. Held won the WDR Improvisation Prize in 2011.

Parts of a concert with guitarist John Scofield in Cologne in January 2014 were released as The Trio Meets John Scofield.

Held's album Recondita Armonia was reviewed by Down Beat: "Held puts an individual spin on the typical ballad album by drawing on all classical themes."

Playing and composing style
Pianist Kit Downes observed that Held "has developed a way of performing with his trio where all 3 of them know each others parts for every tune – so anyone can cue any part of any tune by just playing a small part of it (even if it's in the middle of another tune) – so that they then seamlessly link in other material to the mix".

Discography
An asterisk (*) indicates that the year is that of release.

As leader/co-leader

As sideman

Gallery

References

German jazz pianists
Living people
1986 births
21st-century pianists
Edition Records artists
Pirouet Records artists